María Luisa Vilca (born 15 March 1948) is a Peruvian sprinter. She competed in the women's 100 metres at the 1972 Summer Olympics.

References

1948 births
Living people
Athletes (track and field) at the 1971 Pan American Games
Athletes (track and field) at the 1972 Summer Olympics
Peruvian female sprinters
Olympic athletes of Peru
Place of birth missing (living people)
Pan American Games competitors for Peru
Olympic female sprinters
20th-century Peruvian women